John William Anderson (born 1878) was an English footballer.

Career
Most likely born in County Durham, Anderson started out at non-league Crook Town before turning professional and joining Woolwich Arsenal in December 1896. He soon made his debut, in a Second Division match away to Darwen on 1 January 1897, which Arsenal lost 4–1. He was a mainstay for the rest of the 1896–97 season, playing all three half back positions; his continued versatility meant he remained a regular in the Arsenal side for the next five years.

Anderson's best season for Woolwich Arsenal was 1900–01, where he only missed two league fixtures all season, though he was still being used as a utility man across midfield, without making any single position his own. He continued to be a regular for another season but after the arrival of Roddy McEachrane in 1902, he was squeezed out of the Woolwich Arsenal side; he only played eight games in 1902–03 and left the club at the end of that season. In total he played 153 games for Arsenal, scoring eleven goals. He later joined Southern League Portsmouth; he is not to be confused, however, with the John Anderson who played for Portsmouth in the 1930s.

References

1878 births
Year of death missing
Footballers from County Durham
English footballers
English people of Scottish descent
Association football wing halves
Crook Town A.F.C. players
Arsenal F.C. players
Portsmouth F.C. players
English Football League players